The 2015–16 1. FSV Mainz 05 season is the 111th season in the football club's history and 7th consecutive and 10th overall season in the top flight of German football, the Bundesliga, having been promoted from the 2. Bundesliga in 2009. In addition to the domestic league, Mainz will also participate in this season's edition of the domestic cup, the DFB-Pokal. This will be the 5th season for the club in the Coface Arena, located in Mainz, Germany. The stadium has a capacity of 34,034. The season covers a period from 1 July 2015 to 30 June 2016.

Squad

On loan

Competitions

Bundesliga

League table

Results summary

Results by round

Matches

DFB-Pokal

References

Mainz 05, 1. FSV
1. FSV Mainz 05 seasons